Leukocyte immunoglobulin-like receptor subfamily B member 4 is a protein that in humans is encoded by the LILRB4 gene.

This gene is a member of the leukocyte immunoglobulin-like receptor (LIR) family, which is found in a gene cluster at chromosomal region 19q13.4. The encoded protein belongs to the subfamily B class of LIR receptors which contain two or four extracellular immunoglobulin domains, a transmembrane domain, and two to four cytoplasmic immunoreceptor tyrosine-based inhibitory motifs (ITIMs). The receptor is expressed on monocytic cells and transduces a negative signal that inhibits stimulation of an immune response. The receptor can also function in antigen capture and presentation. It is thought to control inflammatory responses and cytotoxicity to help focus the immune response and limit autoreactivity. LILRB4 has also been proposed to be a potential target for tumor immunotherapy. It has been shown to express on tumor-associated macrophages and negatively regulate immune response in tumor. The expression of LILRB4 on monocytic myeloid leukemia cells supports infiltration and inhibits T cell proliferation. Multiple transcript variants encoding different isoforms have been found for this gene.

Interactions 

LILRB4 has been shown to interact with PTPN6 and INPP5D (SHIP-1).

See also 
 Cluster of differentiation
 Immunoglobulin superfamily

References

Further reading

External links 
 

Clusters of differentiation
Immunoglobulin superfamily